Theobald Mathew may refer to:
Theobald Mathew (temperance reformer) or Father Mathew (1790–1856), Irish temperance reformer
Theobald Mathew (legal humourist) or Theo Mathew (1866–1939), English barrister and legal humourist, great-nephew of Father Mathew
Sir Theobald Mathew (Director of Public Prosecutions) (1898–1964), English Director of Public Prosecutions, nephew of Theo Mathew
Theobald Mathew (officer of arms) (1942–1998), English officer of arms